The Armenian Brotherhood Church (also known by names such as the Armenian Evangelical Brotherhood Church and the Armenian Brotherhood Bible Church) started within the Armenian Evangelical Church in the 19th century. 

The Armenian Orthodox Apostolic Church gave rise to the Armenian Evangelical Church; similarly the Armenian Brotherhood Church was born out of the Armenian Evangelical Church.

In the beginning of the twentieth century, many people in some of the suburbs of Cilicia, including Harpert, Marash, Hasan Bay, Aintab, and Adana, joined the Brotherhood fellowship, a group that sprang out of the Evangelical Church which was having unofficial meetings.

The Armenian genocide did not permit this group to prosper in Cilicia. After the massacres, the remaining Armenian people migrated to the Middle East and settled in Iraq, Syria, Lebanon and Egypt. Those who migrated to Europe mainly settled in Greece and France.

Among those who settled in these countries, some spiritual brothers began similar meetings, first at homes and later in rented halls, and finally, when the number of the constituency increased and funds allowed, they began to move into church buildings.

Among those who migrated to Aleppo, Syria, were Brothers Abraham Seferian, Minas Bozoklian and Mihran Kasardjian. They gathered people of the three denominations, Orthodox, Catholic and Evangelical, and began to have unofficial home Bible studies. In time this group grew and took more official status, and finally it was named as the Spiritual Brotherhood Church. This later spread into other countries, with names such as Armenian Evangelical Brotherhood Church, Armenian Brotherhood Bible Church, etc.

Numerous Brotherhood Churches were established in the Middle East: Beirut, Damascus, Baghdad, Tehran, Cairo, Alexandria. In Europe: Valance, Paris, Athens. And in South America: Buenos Aires, Cordoba, São Paulo, and Montevideo.

The brothers who migrated to North America, established churches in New York, Philadelphia, Boston, Detroit, Chicago, Fresno, Los Angeles, and Pasadena.

Organization
The central committee of the Armenian Brotherhood Church is the Union of Armenian Brotherhood Bible Churches, headquartered in Pasadena, California in the United States.

Regional Union of Europe and the Middle East
Tehran (Iran)
Beirut (Lebanon)
Damascus (Syria)
Yerevan (Armenia)
Athens (Greece)
Alfortville, Paris (France)
Sydney (Australia)
Valence (France)

Regional Union of South America
Buenos Aires (Argentina)
Córdoba (Argentina)
Montevideo (Uruguay)
São Paulo (Brazil)

Regional Union of North America
Pasadena, California (United States)
Hollywood, California (United States)
Glendale, California (United States)
New Milford, New Jersey (United States)
Fresno, California (United States)
Montreal, Quebec (Canada)
Toronto, Ontario (Canada)

Armenian Brotherhood Church - Yerevan

The Armenian Brotherhood Church of Yerevan was founded in 1999 by Pastor Hovhannes Halladjian.

Starting only with couple of faithful members, the community grew into a center of Christian fellowship in the heart of the capital of Armenia.

Pastor Hovhaness, originally from Beirut, spent seven years in Athens serving at the local Armenian Brotherhood Church. He was a skilled organiser, educated in theology, and helped to establish the first Brotherhood church in a post-Soviet breakaway country.

References

External links
Armenian Brotherhood Bible Church of New Jersey
Armenian Brotherhood Bible Church of Pasadena, California
Armenian Evangelical Brotherhood Church of Toronto, Ontario
Armenian Evangelical Brotherhood Church of Buenos Aires, Argentina
Armenian Brotherhood Holy Trinity Church, Sydney

Protestantism in Armenia
Evangelical denominations in Asia